A list of the earliest comedy films produced before the 1920.

Pre-1910

1910s

1890s
Comedy
Comedy
Comedy